This is a list of all the United States Supreme Court cases from volume 385 of the United States Reports:

External links

1966 in United States case law
1967 in United States case law